Silent Night, Deadly Night is a 1984 American slasher film directed by Charles E. Sellier, Jr., and starring Robert Brian Wilson, Lilyan Chauvin, Gilmer McCormick, Toni Nero, Linnea Quigley, Britt Leach, and Leo Geter. The story concerns a young man named Billy, who suffers from post-traumatic stress over witnessing his parents' murder on Christmas Eve by a man disguised as Santa Claus and his subsequent upbringing in an abusive Catholic  orphanage. In adulthood, the Christmas holiday leads him into a psychological breakdown, and he emerges as a spree killer donning a Santa suit.

The film was released by Tri-Star Pictures on November 9, 1984, where it received substantial controversy over its promotional material and content, which featured a killer Santa Claus. In addition to receiving mixed reviews, it was pulled from theaters a week after its release. However, it was a success during its opening week, grossing $2.5 million on a budget of $750,000. Since its release, it has developed a cult following and spawned a series, consisting of four sequels, with the fourth and fifth installments having no connection to the original film, as well as a loose remake in 2012. Another reboot is in development.

Plot 
In 1971, 5-year-old Billy Chapman and his family visit a nursing home in Utah where his catatonic grandfather stays. When Billy's parents leave the room, his grandfather suddenly awakens and tells Billy to fear Santa Claus, as he punishes the naughty.

On the way back home, a criminal dressed in a Santa suit – who had just robbed a liquor store and killed the owner – attempts to carjack the family. As Billy's father tries to drive away, the criminal shoots him dead and then sexually assaults Billy's mother before slashing her throat with a switchblade. Billy flees and hides, leaving his baby brother Ricky in the car.

Three years later, in December 1974, 8-year-old Billy and 4-year-old Ricky are celebrating Christmas in an orphanage run by Mother Superior, a strict disciplinarian who beats children who misbehave and considers punishment to be a "good" thing. Sister Margaret, who sympathizes with the children, tries to help Billy but he is regularly punished. On Christmas, the orphanage invites a man in a Santa Claus suit to visit the children; Billy, forced to sit on his lap by Mother Superior, punches the man before fleeing to his room in horror.

10 years later, in the spring of 1984, Billy turns 18, leaves the orphanage for a normal life, and obtains a job as a stock boy at a local toy store, with support from Sister Margaret. At the store, he develops a crush on his co-worker Pamela; he has sexual thoughts which are often interrupted by morbid visions of his parents' murders. On Christmas Eve, the employee who plays the store's Santa Claus is injured and Billy's boss Mr. Sims makes him take his place. After the store closes, the staff has a Christmas Eve party. Billy, still in a Santa Claus suit, tries to have a good time, but keeps having memories of his parents' murders, causing him to feel depressed. He sees his co-worker Andy making out with Pamela and they walk into the back room. Billy walks after them and sees Andy trying to rape Pamela. This triggers his insanity; he hangs Andy with a string of Christmas lights and, uttering that punishment is "good", murders Pamela with a box cutter.

Next, Billy murders Mr. Sims and his manager Mrs. Randall. Sister Margaret discovers the carnage and returns to the orphanage to seek help. Billy breaks into a nearby house where a young couple named Denise and Tommy are having sex and a little girl named Cindy is sleeping; he impales Denise on a set of deer antlers and throws Tommy through a window. When this awakens Cindy, Billy asks if she has been nice or naughty; she says nice, and he gives her the box cutter he had used earlier. After this, he witnesses bullies picking on two teenage boys and stealing their sleds, and decapitates one of the bullies with his axe.

The next morning, the orphanage is secured with Officer Barnes and Captain Richards and aided by Sister Margaret, who knows that Billy has committed the murders. The deaf pastor, Father O'Brien, who was dressed in a Santa outfit, is shot by Barnes, who mistook him for Billy. As Barnes continues patrolling the area, he is struck in the chest by Billy's axe. Billy confronts Mother Superior, now in a wheelchair. She taunts Billy due to her disbelief in Santa Claus and just as he prepares to kill her, Richards shoots him in the back. Billy drops to the floor, then utters to the children "You're safe now, Santa Claus is gone", before dying from his injuries. A 14-year-old Ricky, coldly staring at Mother Superior, utters "Naughty."

Cast

Production 
The concept of the film was pitched by executive producer Scott J. Schiend who at the time, accepted screenplay ideas in submissions from the public. One of these was a short story entitled He Sees You When You're Sleeping written by a Harvard University student named Paul Caimi. The story was about a killer Santa Claus and Schiend was impressed with the concept even though he disliked slasher films. He then contacted writer Michael Hickey and requested him to write a screenplay based on the short story in which he agreed. Afterwards, Hickey sent the screenplay to Tri-Star Pictures who were pleased with it and agreed to finance and distribute the film.

The film's working title during production was Slayride and it was to be produced by Slayride Productions Inc. Producer Ira Richard Barmak was recruited by Tri-Star to produce the film. Executive producers, Scott J. Schiend and Dennis Whitehead were hoping to hire a new and young director who would be the "next John Carpenter" and considered Sam Raimi, Albert Magnoli, and Ken Kwapis for the position. Tri-Star expressed interests in television producer Charles E. Sellier Jr. who was well known for producing the Life and Times of Grizzly Adams motion picture and TV series. Schiend and Whitehead disagreed believing that a veteran producer would not give the film a good look and reputation; however, Tri-Star insisted and eventually hired Sellier for the position.

Principal photography lasted from March to April 1983 and was shot on location in Heber City and Midway, Utah. At the time, most of the snow was beginning to melt, so the production crew raced to shoot all exterior shots first. Numerous buildings were used for the interior scenes during filming. The orphanage building was an abandoned school house that was renovated by the crew during production. It was then demolished not long after filming concluded. The Ira's Toys building was a vacant building that was rented out by the crew. As of 2022, it still stands and is currently a gym. During filming, director Charles E. Sellier Jr. was too uncomfortable with shooting the murder sequences and this resulted in editor Michael Spence to come in as the stand-in director for these scenes.

The film's cast mainly consisted of local actors in the state of Utah. Lead star Robert Brian Wilson (Billy at age 18) was at the time living in Salt Lake City and had no acting experience. He auditioned for his role as the request of his girlfriend. No major and well-known actors were featured in the film and many mostly had experience in only television acting roles.

During post-production, TriStar had decided to change the Slayride title of the film to Silent Night, Deadly Night. Music composer Perry Botkin was hired to compose the musical score; he did so by watching a betamax copy of the film while composing the score as it played. Afterwards, TriStar hired graphic designer Burt Kleeger to create the infamous theatrical release poster that depicted Santa Claus climbing down a chimney while holding a double-bit axe that also included the film's tagline: "You've made it through Halloween, now try and survive Christmas" along with "He knows when you've been naughty".

Because the film's concept was done before in the 1980 horror film Christmas Evil as well as the first segment of the 1972 horror anthology film, Tales from the Crypt, the producers and TriStar were not concerned about the killer Santa Claus theme being controversial. However, there was concern that the portrayal of the Catholic Church in the film would be. Because of this, TriStar agreed to distribute the film in a limited release in the mostly protestant midwestern United States before moving forward with releasing it in the dominantly catholic northeastern United States. TriStar set the film's theatrical release date as November 9, 1984, around the start of the Christmas season. Robert Brian Wilson expressed dissatisfaction with this decision, believing that the film should have been released around Halloween to avoid less controversy.

Release 
The film was released theatrically by Tri-Star Pictures on November 9, 1984, opening in 398 theaters in the Midwest United States. On its opening weekend, the film finished eighth, grossing $1,432,800. It outgrossed Wes Craven's landmark slasher A Nightmare on Elm Street, which opened the same day (albeit in 235 fewer theaters). Before being pulled from theaters, it grossed over $2.4 million in its first 10 days of release.

In November 2013, it was announced that Fangoria in association with Brainstorm Media and Screenvision would be re-releasing the film to theaters in the United States throughout December 2013.

Controversy and censorship 
Silent Night, Deadly Night was one of the most controversial films of the 1980s due to its advertising campaign, particularly its posters and TV spots, that made significant emphasis on the killer being dressed as Santa Claus. The PTA fought to have this film removed from theaters due to its subject matter and the fact that it was shown around Christmas, although an earlier film with a similar premise, Christmas Evil, had gone unnoticed. Television advertisements, which aired between episodes of family-friendly series such as Little House on the Prairie, led to parents complaining that their children were terrified of Santa Claus. Large crowds (mostly angry families) formed at theaters and malls around the nation to protest the film; at the film's East Coast premiere at the Interboro Quad Theater in The Bronx in New York City, protesters picketed the theater and sang Christmas carols in protest. 

In response, Tri-Star Pictures (which was the joint venture between Columbia Pictures, HBO, and CBS), the film's original distributor, pulled all ads for the film six days after its release on November 15, 1984. The film itself was also withdrawn shortly thereafter, due to the controversy. In response to the public outcry, producer Ira Barmak told People magazine: "People have taken offense at Santa being used in a scary context... Santa Claus is not a religious figure, he's a mythic character. I didn't deliberately ride roughshod over that sensitivity and I didn't anticipate the objection to it." An editorial published in Variety stated: "Most protests were generated by the feeling that the depiction of a killer in a Santa Claus suit would traumatize children and undermine their traditional trust in Santa Claus." When the film was castigated at length by Gene Siskel and Roger Ebert, the backlash against the film became louder and more widespread.

The film was due to be re-released by an independent distributor, Aquarius Films, in May 1985, with an ad campaign replacing the original "Twas the night before Christmas"-themed trailer with a new one that centered on the controversy surrounding the film and edited out all close-up shots of Billy, in the Santa suit, with weapons. The print ad material also replaced the original 'Chimney' picture with one that talked about the controversy. However, the film only had further test engagements.

In the United Kingdom, the movie was never submitted for certification to the BBFC, and its sequel was denied a video certificate in 1987 after the distributors refused to make the cuts required for an '18' certificate. However, in 2009, Arrow Films submitted the film to the BBFC for classification, who passed the film uncut with an 18 certificate. The UK DVD was released on November 23, 2009.

Differences between the R Rated and Unrated versions 
According to Robert Brian Wilson, the film had to be re-submitted 4 times to the MPAA to secure an R rating. When released to theatres, Tri-Star originally made these cuts, but when released on home video, the film was unrated. The film was sourced from another master copy containing these scenes. The Theatrical R-rated version never received a home video release until December 4, 2017. Due to the film having these scenes missing from other master copies, Anchor Bay DVD and Blu-ray releases were released as composite cuts. In hopes that Shout! Factory would find uncut footage from the original negatives, their search was unsuccessful. According to them, Tri-Star edited out all uncut footage from all their negatives.

The following edits were made in the R-rated version:
 A shot of Billy being slashed by Santa in his nightmare is removed.
 After Sims asks Billy what Santa does, it cuts immediately to Andy and Pamela going into the stock room.
 Sims and Randall singing carols has been entirely redone.
 Billy's flashback has been edited.
 Footage of Billy killing Pamela is edited.
 Randall's death is edited.
 The deer impalement scene is shortened.
 The sledding decapitation scene is shortened.
 Officer Barnes' death has been edited.

Critical response 
On the review aggregator website Rotten Tomatoes, Silent Night, Deadly Night holds an approval rating of 44% based on 25 reviews, with an average rating of 4.9/10. 

Siskel and Ebert condemned the film and Siskel went as far as to read names of the film's production crew on air, telling them, "Shame on you". Gene Siskel also said that all the money the filmmakers were making off of this film was blood money.

Leonard Maltin also denounced the movie, calling it a "...worthless splatter film", citing it as a "BOMB" and asking: "What's next, the Easter Bunny as a child molester?" A Daily Variety review argued that whatever arguments the film was making on the commercialism of Christmas were overshadowed by the graphic violence, which the reviewer saw as off-putting. Michael Wilmington wrote in the Los Angeles Times: "[it's] safe to predict that Silent Night, Deadly Night... will start making 'Worst Movie of All Time' lists almost immediately".

One positive notice came from Kirk Ellis from The Hollywood Reporter, who complimented director Sellier's "workmanlike competence" and praised the cinematography and Gilmer McCormack's performance as Sister Margaret.

Home media 
Originally planned to be released on home media by RCA/Columbia Pictures Home Video in early 1985, the home media release was cancelled. The film was then originally released on VHS and Beta in May 1986 through USA Home Video. The film was released on Laserdisc in 1987 and reissued on VHS by International Video Entertainment in 1987 and 1988. In 1992, the film was last released on VHS for the last time by Avid Home Entertainment.

The film was released on as a double feature disc alongside sequel Silent Night, Deadly Night Part 2 in 2003.  The second release was in 2007. The first two Region 1 releases are currently out of print.

The film was released on DVD in the United Kingdom in 2009 by Arrow Video; this set includes an audio interview with director Charles E. Sellier Jr., poster, booklet including "Deadly Director: Charles Sellier Interviewed by Calum Waddell" and "Silent Night, Sex Night: The Slice and Times of Linnea Quigley".

On December 4, 2012, the film was again released alongside Part 2 as a two-disc "Christmas Survival Double Feature", containing the same archival bonus features as the 2003 release.

On September 16, 2014, it was released on Blu-ray by Anchor Bay/Starz Entertainment. No new special features were included, with the exception of a few new commentaries, none of which any of the actors participated in. The Blu-ray contains exactly the same release as previous DVD editions with the extended scenes edited back into the film with noticeable picture quality changes. There has yet to be a release of the full, uncut print from a single source.

On December 5, 2017, Shout! Factory, under its Scream Factory label, released the film in a two-disc set collector's edition on Blu-ray and DVD. It contains the film remastered in a 4K resolution from the original negative sourced from the original R-rated theatrical cut while the unrated version used SD inserts. It also contained new special features such as an interview and audio commentary from actors Robert Brian Wilson and Linnea Quigley, co-executive producers Scott J. Schneid and Dennis Whitehead, writer Michael Hickey, music composer Perry Botkin, and editor Michael Spence. It also contained a new documentary on the making of the film entitled Slay Bells Ring: The Story of Silent Night, Deadly Night which included interviews from the cast and crew. The original theatrical trailer, radio and TV spots are included. It also contained the original special features from the 2003 and 2012 DVD and 2014 Blu-ray releases as well.

Scream Factory also released a limited edition deluxe offer that contained the collector's edition set along with a 18x24 size poster of the new artwork for the film, as well as an 8" tall figure of Billy in his Santa suit holding his double-bit axe. This offer was limited to 2,000 orders and pre-orders started on September 7, 2017.

Sequels and remakes 

Due to the minor success of the film, four sequels were produced. The first two, Silent Night, Deadly Night Part 2 and Silent Night, Deadly Night 3: Better Watch Out!, focus on Billy's younger brother Ricky becoming in turn a serial killer. However, Silent Night, Deadly Night 4: Initiation and Silent Night, Deadly Night 5: The Toy Maker have no connection with the characters from the previous films, with each of them focusing on a different Christmas-themed horror story.

A loose remake of the film, titled Silent Night, was released on December 4, 2012, starring Jaime King and Malcolm McDowell.

On March 2, 2021, another remake was announced when Orwo Studios and Black Hanger Studios acquired the rights to the original film.

References

Works cited

External links 
 
 
 
 
 

1984 horror films
1984 films
1984 thriller films
1980s horror thriller films
1984 independent films
1980s slasher films
1980s Christmas horror films
American independent films
American thriller films
American Christmas horror films
American slasher films
Films about sexual repression
Films about Catholic nuns
Films set in 1971
Films set in 1974
Films set in 1984
Films set in Utah
Films shot in Salt Lake City
Films shot in Utah
Santa Claus in film
Silent Night, Deadly Night films
TriStar Pictures films
Films about orphans
Obscenity controversies in film
Films about child abuse
Films about rape
American psychological horror films
Film controversies in the United States
American psychological thriller films
Films about mass murder
Films directed by Charles Sellier
Films scored by Perry Botkin Jr.
Films with screenplays by Michael Hickey
Advertising and marketing controversies in film
American exploitation films
1980s exploitation films
Censored films
American splatter films
1980s English-language films
1980s American films